= Mahamane Baby =

Malian politician

Mahamane Baby is a Malian politician. He serves as the Malian Minister of Employment & Professional Training.
